Podlog v Savinjski Dolini is a settlement in the Savinja Valley in the Municipality of Žalec in east-central Slovenia. It lies northeast of Šempeter. The area is part of the traditional region of Styria. The municipality is now included in the Savinja Statistical Region.

Name
The name of the settlement was changed from Podlog to Podlog v Savinjski Dolini in 1953.

References

External links
Podlog v Savinjski Dolini at Geopedia

Populated places in the Municipality of Žalec